Mercedes Arriaga Flórez (Oviedo, July 29, 1960) is a Spanish philologist. Full professor in Italian philology at the University of Seville (2009), with a degree on Italian philology from the University of Salamanca (1984) and modern and contemporary Italian Writings by the University of Bari (1989). She achieved her first PhD at the University of Seville in 1993 and the second in language sciences and theory of signs from the University of Bari (Italy) in 1995. Nowadays, she holds a chair at the Asociación Universitaria de Estudios de las Mujeres (AUDEM) . From 2012, she is also a member of the board of the Sociedad Española de Italianistas (SEI).

Academic career 
Mercedes Arriaga Flórez is nowadays a lecturer in the Official Master on Gender Studies and Professional Development at the University of Seville and keeps on investigating as leading researcher of the university group "Escritoras y Escrituras" following the paths "Ausencias:  Escritoras Italianas Inéditas (en la Querella de las Mujeres)" and "Escritoras y pensadoras europeas.".

References 

People from Oviedo
21st-century Spanish women writers
Living people
20th-century Spanish women writers
1960 births
University of Seville alumni
University of Salamanca alumni
University of Bari alumni
Academic staff of the University of Seville
Spanish philologists
Women philologists